S. Kumara Kurubara Ramanathan was an Indian politician and former Member of the Legislative Assembly. He was elected to the Tamil Nadu legislative assembly as a Dravida Munnetra Kazhagam candidate from Vilathikulam constituency in 1984 election.

References 

Dravida Munnetra Kazhagam politicians
Living people
Year of birth missing (living people)

Tamil Nadu MLAs 1985–1989